The North Sea Fleet  was a  naval formation and major operational command of the British Royal Navy based at Great Yarmouth from 1745 to 1802 then at Ramsgate from 1803 until 1815.

The fleet was commanded by the Commander-in-Chief, North Sea.

History
From the thirteenth until the fifteenth century the North Sea had been an important command from the 13th to 15th centuries an Admiral of the North based at Yarmouth was appointed to commanded a Northern Fleet. During the Tudor Period Vice Admirals were appointed to command a  North Sea Squadron operating from Newcastle though that squadron was usually formed only on a temporary basis. From 1652 to 1654 Yarmouth used by the Royal Navy for stationing its North Sea Fleet during the First Anglo-Dutch War. A more permanent formation was established from 1745. In May 1804 in the middle of Napoleon's planned invasion of the United Kingdom (1803-1805) at the start of the War of the Third Coalition, although never carried out, was a major influence on British naval strategy and the fortification of the coast of southeast England. 

In 1804 the North Sea Fleet then under the command of Admiral of the White: George Elphinstone, Viscount Keith reached its largest composition consisting of some 170-179 ships (according to sources given) divided primarily between squadrons each commanded by competent admirals including one off Boulogne, France under Rear-Admiral of the Blue Thomas Louis, one in the Downs under Vice-Admiral of the White John Holloway, one off Flushing, Batavian Republic under Rear-Admiral of the White Sidney Smith, under Edward Thornborough, one under Rear-Admiral of the Red at Texel, Batavian Republic, another in Scotland at Leith under Rear-Admiral of the White James Vashon and finally one  stationed at Yarmouth Roads under Rear-Admiral of the Red Thomas Macnamara Russell together with a cruising and convoy force all reporting Lord Keith.

In Command

Composition of the fleet in May 1804

References

Fleets of the Royal Navy